The double-striped thick-knee (Burhinus bistriatus) is a stone-curlew, a group of waders in the family Burhinidae. The vernacular name refers to the prominent joints in the long greenish-grey legs, and bistriatus to the two stripes of the head pattern.

Taxonomy
The double-striped thick-knee was formally described in 1829 by the German naturalist Johann Georg Wagler from a specimen collected in Mexico. He coined the binomial name Charadrius bistriatus. The specific epithet biscutatus combines the Latin bi- meaning "two-" or "double-" with scutatus meaning "armed with a shield" (scutum was an oblong shield). The double-striped thick-knee is now placed in the genus Burhinus that was erected by the German zoologist Johann Karl Wilhelm Illiger in 1811.

Four subspecies are recognised:
 B. b. bistriatus (Wagler, 1829) – south Mexico to northwest Costa Rica
 B. b. vocifer (L'Herminier, 1837) – Venezuela, Guyana and north Brazil
 B. b. pediacus Wetmore & Borrero, 1964 – north Colombia
 B. b. dominicensis (Cory, 1883) – Hispaniola

Description

The double-striped thick-knee is a medium-large wader with a strong black and yellow bill, large yellow eyes, which give it a reptilian appearance, and cryptic plumage. It has finely streaked grey-brown upperparts, and a paler brown neck and breast merging into the white belly. The head has a strong white supercilium bordered above by a black stripe. Juveniles are similar to adults, but have slightly darker brown upperparts and a whitish nape. The double-striped thick-knee is striking in flight, with a white patch on the dark upperwing, and a white underwing with a black rear edge.

The four subspecies differ in size and plumage tone, but individual variation makes identification of races difficult.

Distribution and habitat
It is a resident breeder in Central and South America from southern Mexico south to Colombia, Venezuela and northern Brazil. It also occurs on Hispaniola and some of the Venezuelan islands, and is a very rare vagrant to Trinidad, Curaçao and the USA. It prefers arid grassland, savanna, and other dry, open habitats.

Behaviour
This is a largely nocturnal and crepuscular species. It flies only reluctantly, relying on crouching and camouflage for concealment. The double-striped thick-knee eats large insects and other small vertebrate and invertebrate prey. It is sometimes semi-domesticated because of its useful function in controlling insects, and has benefited from the clearing of woodlands to create pasture. The song, given at night, is a loud kee-kee-kee.

Breeding
The nest is a bare scrape into which two olive-brown eggs are laid and incubated by both adults for 25–27 days to hatching. The downy young are precocial and soon leave the nest.

References

External links

 
 Photo of double-striped thick-knee displaying, Photo 2; Venezuela Photo Gallery at Borderland Tours
 
 
 

double-striped thick-knee
Birds of Central America
Birds of Mexico
Birds of Hispaniola
Birds of the Dominican Republic
Birds of Guatemala
Birds of El Salvador
Birds of Nicaragua
Birds of Colombia
Birds of Venezuela
Birds of the Guianas
double-striped thick-knee
Taxa named by Johann Georg Wagler